The Kansas Wesleyan Coyotes program is a college football team that represents Kansas Wesleyan University in the Kansas Collegiate Athletic Conference, a part of the NAIA.  The team has had 20 head coaches since its first recorded football game in 1903. The current coach is Myers Hendrickson, who assumed the role in early 2019.  Hendrickson had been an assistant under the previous head coach Matt Drinkall who was hired in January 2014.  Drinkall replaced coach Dave Dallas who first took the position for the 1997 season and resigned at the end of the 2013 season.

Key

Coaches

See also

 List of people from Salina, Kansas

Notes

References 

Lists of college football head coaches

Kansas sports-related lists